The 1902 Central Oklahoma Bronchos football team represented Central Normal School during their inaugural season. The team played their first year without a head coach and were headquartered in Edmond, Oklahoma. The Central squad finished the season with a record of 0–1.

Schedule

References

Central Oklahoma
Central Oklahoma Bronchos football seasons
College football winless seasons
Central Oklahoma Football